= Naum Naumtsev =

Personal information
- Date of birth: 16 October 1913
- Place of birth: Baku, Russian Empire
- Date of death: 30 November 2000 (aged 87)
- Place of death: Samara, Russia
- Position: Defender

Naum Grigoryevich Naumtsev (Russian: Наум Григорьевич Наумцев; 16 October 1913 – 30 November 2000) was a Soviet footballer who played as a defender, and served the Soviet Union in World War II.

== Football career ==
Naum Naumtsev was born on 16 October 1913 in Baku.

Throughout his football career, Naum Naumtsev played for teams including "Temp Baku", "Dynamo GOHM", "Neftyanik", "South Builder", Tbilisi’s "Dynamo" and "DO Tbilisi", and Moscow's "Red Army". He appeared in 60 matches in the Soviet Top League and scored 1 goal.

In 1947, he won the bronze medal in the Soviet Top League as a member of "Dynamo Tbilisi".

== Military service ==
In August 1940, Naum Naumtsev was drafted into the Second World War, "Victory over Germany in the Great Patriotic War 1941–1945" medal, and the Order of the Patriotic War 2nd Class (1985).

== Personal life ==
Naum Naumtsev was married to Zoya Nikolayevna Astafyeva, an actress in a Baku theater. They had a son named Yuri Naumtsev, who became a professional basketball player and actor and played on the Soviet Union men's national basketball team.
